Robbie Kiely (born 9 October 1991) is an Irish Gaelic football player who plays plays his club football for Barryroe GAA in Cork and previously at inter-county level for Tipperary.

Career
Kiely made his championship debut for Tipperary in 2011 against Louth 	
On 31 July 2016, he started in the half back line as Tipperary defeated Galway in the 2016 All-Ireland Quarter-finals at Croke Park to reach their first All-Ireland semi-final since 1935.

On 21 August 2016, Tipperary were beaten in the semi-final by Mayo on a 2-13 to 0-14 scoreline, with Kiely receiving a black card in the first ten minutes of the match for a pull on the jersey of Jason Doherty which the referee David Coldrick deemed as a cynical foul.
Former players including Jim McGuinness and Peter Canavan have said that the black card was a wrong decision by the referee.

On 22 November 2020, Tipperary won the 2020 Munster Senior Football Championship after a 0-17 to 0-14 win against Cork in the final. It was Tipperary's first Munster title in 85 years.

In May 2021, Kiely was ruled out for the entirety of the delayed 2021 season after sustaining a grade three C hamstring tear and tendon damage.

In January 2023, Kiely announced his retirement form inter-county football after 11 years.

Honours
Tipperary
Munster Under-21 Football Championship (1): 2010
 National Football League Division 3 (1): 2017
Munster Senior Football Championship (1): 2020
West Cork Junior Football League Division 3B (1): 2021

References

External links
Tipperary GAA Profile

1990s births
Living people
Tipperary inter-county Gaelic footballers